Linda Veras (born Sieglinda Veras in 1939) is a former Italian actress and glamour model. She is best known for her appearances in Spaghetti Westerns, namely Sergio Sollima's Face to Face and Run, Man, Run, and Gianfranco Parolini's Sabata.

Filmography

External links
 

1939 births
Italian female models
Living people
Italian film actresses
Spaghetti Western actresses
20th-century Italian actresses